Pyaar Impossible! is a 2010 Indian romantic comedy film directed by Jugal Hansraj that was released under the banner of Yash Raj Films. It features Priyanka Chopra and Uday Chopra playing the leads with Advika Yadav, Anupam Kher, and Dino Morea in supporting roles. 

The movie marks Priyanka Chopra's first collaboration with Yash Raj Films, Advika Yadav's debut as a child artist, and the penultimate big screen appearance of Uday Chopra.

Plot 
In Ankert University, California, Alisha (Priyanka Chopra) is the most beautiful girl on campus with plenty of admirers. Awkward, nerdy Abhay (Uday Chopra) is in love with her, although she is unaware of his existence. One night Alisha is partying with her friends and accidentally falls into a river. Abhay jumps in and rescues her from drowning, but her friends take her away before she regains consciousness. Abhay is further prevented from seeing Alisha the next day when her outraged father comes and removes her from college.

Abhay nurses dreams of uniting with Alisha for seven years as he moves on with his life. He invents a revolutionary software program that cross integrates all operating systems. He meets with an investor to try to sell it, and he excuses himself to call his father and ask for advice. While he is gone, the investor copies the files onto a drive and steals them. Abhay discovers that this investor is the unscrupulous software salesman Siddharth 'Siddhu' Singh (Dino Morea), and he is now marketing the stolen software to a Singaporean firm as his own invention. Abhay goes to Singapore to confront Siddhu and sees Alisha at the company headquarters where she works as its PR representative. Still besotted, he follows her home. Due to a misunderstanding, she mistakes him for a nanny she was expecting from an employment agency. She is divorced with an unruly daughter named Tanya (Advika Yadav) and in search of another nanny, as Tanya drives every one away. Abhay decides to become Tanya's nanny and keeps his identity a secret to stay close to Alisha.

Abhay takes care of the house mostly by paying contractors to clean it and eventually wins over Tanya when he buys her the Rockband video game so she can become a rockstar. Tanya nicknames him "Froggy" because of his nerdy looks. Things become complicated when Siddhu shows up trying to romance Alisha and sells the stolen software to her company. Abhay finds out that Siddharth's real name is Varun Sanghvi and tries to hide from Varun even while he grows closer to Alisha. She confides in Abhay, and he dresses her up in glasses and old clothes to show her how differently people are treated when they appear to be unattractive. Alisha feels sorry for Abhay.

As the launch date for the software approaches, Abhay is unmasked by Varun who claims he is a delusional stalker and was never a nanny. Alisha is angry that he lied and orders Abhay out of the house without giving him a chance to explain.

She finds out from her daughter that Abhay is the mysterious person who rescued her in college; she realizes that when Abhay told her about the girl he loved in college for seven years, he was talking about her.

Alisha finds Abhay and apologizes to him saying that she has fallen in love with him. Abhay tells her that he created the software Varun is taking the credit for. They rush to the software launch to stop Varun who is easily discredited when he doesn't know the password to Abhay's software. Abhay is able to prove that it is his creation by entering the password. Abhay tells Alisha that she already knows the password: It is her name: A-L-I-S-H-A. Alisha and Abhay live happily with Tanya.

Cast

Soundtrack 
Released on 14 December 2009, the soundtrack for the film has been composed by Salim–Sulaiman with lyrics penned by Anvita Dutt Guptan, song recording & mixing by Vijay Dayal, and Abhijit Vaghani remixing two scores. Ahmed Khan was appointed as the director of choreography for each number.

Track listing

Reception 
Apart from plugging through sources like Music Ka Maha Muqqabla, Bigg Boss, and Radio Mirchi, the crew rolled with various promotion-related techniques. On 12 May 2009, an interactive website was launched, where users could track the complete shooting journey while browsing past Abhay & Alisha's virtual rooms. Although the domain has been relocated to an obligated section in YRF's original website, a playlist featuring a fun package of deleted sequences, behind the scenes, and-so-forth is still available on YouTube.

Box office 
Akin to most movies given from the leading pair individually, Pyaar Impossible! only charmed a specific segment of the audience, and hence performed inadequately upon release. Priyanka said, "Please don't start hunting for a classic tale, a la Mughal-e-Azam here, because that was never the intent," while telling Indo-Asian News Service that the team's motive was in creating a feel-good picture that can be recognized by the teens and the youth in telling their story.

As maintained by Box Office India, a worldwide grossing of almost ₹9 crore was collected, making the film a commercial failure.

References

External links 
 
 
 Twitter account
 Facebook page

2010s Hindi-language films
2010 romantic comedy films
2010 films
Yash Raj Films films
Films shot in Singapore
Films set in Singapore
Hindi remakes of Malayalam films
Indian romantic comedy films